The Botswana Davis Cup team represents Botswana in Davis Cup tennis competition and are governed by the Botswana Tennis Association. They have not competed since 2017.

The Botswana Davis Cup team has been a rapidly growing Davis Cup Team in this elite competition and have been steadily been improving their World ranking. Botswana is currently ranked in the top 15 nations in African tennis.

History
Botswana competed in its first Davis Cup in 1996.

Current team (2022) 

 Denzel Seetso (Junior player)
 Lefa Ashley Sibanda
 Thato Holmes
 Tshepo Mosarwa

Team (2009)
 Shingirai Muzondiwa
 Thabiso Shatiso Mabaka
 Matshidiso Malope
 Lefa Ashley Mthandazo Sixtus Sibanda

Team (2010)
 Shingirai Muzondiwa
 Thabiso Shatiso Mabaka
 Lefa Ashley Mthandazo Sixtus Sibanda
 Bakang Duke Mosinyi

Team (2013)
 Phenyo Matong
 Shingirai Muzondiwa 
 Innocent Tidimane (junior player)
 Aobakwe Lekang

Team (2014)
 Phenyo Matong
 Shingirai Muzondiwa
 Thabiso Shatiso Mabaka
 Lame Botshoma

See also
Davis Cup
Botswana Fed Cup team
Botswana Tennis Association

External links

Davis Cup teams
Davis Cup
Davis Cup